The United States Army has maintained multiple military bands in its over two centuries of service. These bands provides musical support for military camps and bases, military areas, and communities across the mainland United States and other territories such as Puerto Rico. United States military bands also serve in army units outside the country and in regions such as Western Europe or Eastern Asia. There are currently 88 army bands, which consists of 20 active duty regional bands, 13 reserve bands, 51 National Guard bands, and four premier bands. Many bandsmen are trained as part of Band of the Army School of Music at Virginia Beach before their assignment in these bands.

Premier ensembles

List of active regional bands

List of Army Reserve bands

List of Army National Guard bands

Notable bands that existed in history

Colored bands

During World War I, the mobilization of all African-American bands became common. Among them was the Band of the 369th Infantry Regiment (nicknamed the "Harlem Hellfighters Band") led by James Reese Europe who uniquely utilized black blues and jazz and notably introduced jazz to Europe. The 404th Armed Service Forces Band was the only all-black all-female band in military history. Other colored bands include the Band of the 107th Colored Infantry and the Band of the 805th Pioneer Infantry.

Women's bands
The first all-women military band, the Women's Army Band, was organized at Fort Des Moines in 1942 by Sergeant Mary Belle Nissly. By early 1943, the Women's Army Auxiliary Corps (WAAC) had been at a capacity to where it could sport five bands:

 400th Army Band
 401st Army Band
 402nd Army Band
 403rd Army Band
 404th Army Band

WAAC bands were later redesignated and officially activated in the Women's Army Corps (WAC) in January 1944. For a long time, the only Army Band made up of women, was the 14th Army WAC Band, which reported to the Women's Army Corps Training Center at Camp Lee in August 1948.

Mounted bands

In the first 100 years of the country's existence, mounted bands were relatively common in the ranks of military units. Mounted bands began to be assembled in the 1840s, taking multiple years to assemble. Mounted band that existed have included the 3rd Cavalry Regiment Mounted Band and the Mounted Band of the 2nd U.S. Cavalry. Mounted bands in the US Army were ultimately disbanded in the 1930s and 40s and by the end of the Second World War, there were no mounted bands left in the U.S.

Other bands
Beginning in the 1880s, the United States Army Corps of Engineers maintained a band at the U.S. Army Engineer School (then the Engineers School at Willets Point, New York). Then, it was led by Swiss immigrant Julius Hamper, and was dissolved in the early 1900s after over 20 years of service in Washington D.C.
Former service-wide bands include the Military Intelligence Corps Band, the Signal Corps Band and the Army Ground Forces Band.
The Seventh Army Symphony Orchestra was the only symphonic orchestral ensemble to operated in the United States Army, operating from 1952 to 1962.
The U.S. Army All-American Marching Band was an army-sponsored civilian marching band that recruited from high school senior musicians from 2007 to 2019.

See also

Marine Corps Musician Enlistment Option Program
Navy Music Program
List of United States Air Force bands
United States Coast Guard Band
United States military bands
British military bands
Canadian military bands
Directorate of Music

References

Bands of the United States Army
Lists of United States Army units and formations